Web Sudoku is an online sudoku website which was rated as one of the best 50 fun and games website by Time. It was founded by Gideon Greenspan and Rachel Lee. The website was rated as the 7265th best website in the world by Jonathan Harchick in his book The World's Best Websites. Greenspan claimed that about three million people play on the site, adding that the numbers  "are still growing very rapidly from week to week". He added that some of the players solve dozens of puzzles every day.

References

Internet properties established in 2005
Sudoku